The 2017–18 Brooklyn Nets season was the 42nd season of the franchise in the National Basketball Association (NBA), 51st season overall, and its sixth season playing in the New York City borough of Brooklyn.

Draft picks

The Nets would enter the draft holding two first round picks and one second round pick. The highest first round pick would be from the Washington Wizards, who acquired the pick alongside Andrew Nicholson and bringing back Marcus Thornton in exchange for Bojan Bogdanović and Chris McCullough. As for both their other first round pick (which was Pick #27) and the sole second round pick they have, those would be had from their most infamous trade with the Boston Celtics for both Kevin Garnett and Paul Pierce, while swapping first round picks this year (which was the #1 pick originally). With their original second round pick, they lost that pick to the Atlanta Hawks in order for them to acquire Joe Johnson. On June 20, two days before the 2017 NBA Draft began, Brooklyn would trade their 27th pick from Boston (which became power forward Kyle Kuzma from Utah University) alongside star center Brook Lopez to the Los Angeles Lakers for point guard D'Angelo Russell and champion center Timofey Mozgov. On draft night, the Nets selected freshman center Jarrett Allen from University of Texas with the first round pick they acquired from Washington. Under his sole season there, Allen recorded averages of 13.4 points and 8.4 rebounds per game while making it to the All-Big 12 Third Team as a member of the Longhorns. They also selected the Bulgarian/Cypriot/Greek tri-citizen power forward Aleksandar Vezenkov, who previously last played in the FC Barcelona Lassa out in the Liga ACB in Spain. As a player who previously played for both the Barcelona Lassa and Aris Thessaloniki under the Greek Basket League, Vezenkov earned numerous honors out in both Greece and Spain, including being the Greek League's MVP back in 2015 and winning the Spanish Supercup the same year.

Roster

<noinclude>

Game log

Preseason

|- style="background:#cfc;"
| 1
| October 3
| @ New York
| 
| D'Angelo Russell (19)
| Trevor Booker (13)
| D'Angelo Russell (4)
| Madison Square Garden14,981
| 1–0
|- style="background:#cfc;"
| 2
| October 5
| Miami
| 
| Jeremy Lin (16)
| Booker, Carroll, Hollis-Jefferson, Mozgov (8)
| Spencer Dinwiddie (6)
| Barclays CenterN/A
| 2–0
|- style="background:#cfc;"
| 3
| October 8
| New York
| 
| D'Angelo Russell (16)
| Acy, Hollis-Jefferson (8)
| Lin, Russell (7)
| Barclays Center14,161
| 3–0
|- style="background:#fcc;"
| 4
| October 11
| Philadelphia
| 
| D'Angelo Russell (24)
| Acy, Allen (7)
| Spencer Dinwiddie (4)
| Nassau Veterans Memorial ColiseumN/A
| 3–1

Regular season

|- style="background:#fcc;"
| 1
| October 18
| @ Indiana
| 
| D'Angelo Russell (30)
| Trevor Booker (10)
| D'Angelo Russell (5)
| Bankers Life Fieldhouse15,008
| 0–1
|- style="background:#bfb;"
| 2
| October 20
| Orlando
| 
| Booker, Carroll, Russell (17)
| Trevor Booker (11)
| D'Angelo Russell (6)
| Barclays Center16,144
| 1–1
|- style="background:#bfb;"
| 3
| October 22
| Atlanta
| 
| Allen Crabbe (20)
| Rondae Hollis-Jefferson (7)
| D'Angelo Russell (10)
| Barclays Center13,917
| 2–1
|- style="background:#fcc;"
| 4
| October 24
| @ Orlando
| 
| D'Angelo Russell (29)
| Booker, LeVert (8)
| Caris LeVert (5)
| Amway Center16,015
| 2–2
|- style="background:#bfb;"
| 5
| October 25
| Cleveland
| 
| Spencer Dinwiddie (22)
| Trevor Booker (8)
| Spencer Dinwiddie (6)
| Barclays Center17,732
| 3–2
|- style="background:#fcc;"
| 6
| October 27
| @ New York
| 
| D'Angelo Russell (15)
| Carroll, Mozgov (5)
| Spencer Dinwiddie (11)
| Madison Square Garden19,812
| 3–3
|- style="background:#fcc;"
| 7
| October 29
| Denver
| 
| Spencer Dinwiddie (22)
| Timofey Mozgov (11)
| D'Angelo Russell (8)
| Barclays Center14,854
| 3–4
|- style="background:#fcc;"
| 8
| October 31
| Phoenix
| 
| D'Angelo Russell (33)
| Rondae Hollis-Jefferson (7)
| Dinwiddie, Russell (4)
| Barclays Center12,936
| 3–5

|- style="background:#fcc;"
| 9
| November 3
| @ LA Lakers
| 
| Allen Crabbe (25)
| DeMarre Carroll (8)
| D'Angelo Russell (7)
| Staples Center18,997
| 3–6
|- style="background:#bfb;"
| 10
| November 6
| @ Phoenix
| 
| D'Angelo Russell (23)
| DeMarre Carroll (11)
| D'Angelo Russell (8)
| Talking Stick Resort Arena15,905
| 4–6
|- style="background:#fcc;"
| 11
| November 7
| @ Denver
| 
| Tyler Zeller (21)
| Jacob Wiley (8)
| D'Angelo Russell (6)
| Pepsi Center14,058
| 4–7
|- style="background:#bfb;"
| 12
| November 10
| @ Portland
| 
| D'Angelo Russell (21)
| Carroll, Hollis-Jefferson (8)
| D'Angelo Russell (9)
| Moda Center19,393
| 5–7
|- style="background:#fcc;"
| 13
| November 11
| @ Utah
| 
| D'Angelo Russell (26)
| DeMarre Carroll (7)
| Hollis-Jefferson, Russell (3)
| Vivint Smart Home Arena17,413
| 5–8
|- style="background:#fcc;"
| 14
| November 14
| Boston
| 
| Joe Harris (19)
| Rondae Hollis-Jefferson (9)
| Spencer Dinwiddie (11)
| Barclays Center17,732
| 5–9
|- style="background:#bfb;"
| 15
| November 17
| Utah
| 
| Spencer Dinwiddie (25)
| Booker, Crabbe, Dinwiddie, Zeller (5)
| Spencer Dinwiddie (8)
| Barclays Center14,495
| 6–9
|- style="background:#fcc;"
| 16
| November 19
| Golden State
| 
| Allen Crabbe (25)
| Rondae Hollis-Jefferson (12)
| Spencer Dinwiddie (8)
| Barclays Center17,732
| 6–10
|- style="background:#fcc;"
| 17
| November 22
| @ Cleveland
| 
| Rondae Hollis-Jefferson (20)
| LeVert, Zeller (7)
| Spencer Dinwiddie (10)
| Quicken Loans Arena20,562
| 6–11
|- style="background:#fcc;"
| 18
| November 24
| Portland
| 
| Spencer Dinwiddie (23)
| DeMarre Carroll (9)
| Spencer Dinwiddie (6)
| Barclays Center15,246
| 6–12
|- style="background:#bfb;"
| 19
| November 26
| @ Memphis
| 
| DeMarre Carroll (24)
| Trevor Booker (11)
| Spencer Dinwiddie (7)
| FedExForum14,889
| 7–12
|- style="background:#fcc;"
| 20
| November 27
| @ Houston
| 
| Isaiah Whitehead (24)
| Jarrett Allen (8)
| Spencer Dinwiddie (7)
| Toyota Center16,189
| 7–13
|- style="background:#bfb;"
| 21
| November 29
| @ Dallas
| 
| DeMarre Carroll (22)
| Trevor Booker (10)
| Spencer Dinwiddie (6)
| American Airlines Center19,327
| 8–13

|- style="background:#fcc;"
| 22
| December 2
| Atlanta
| 
| Spencer Dinwiddie (15)
| DeMarre Carroll (10)
| Spencer Dinwiddie (9)
| Barclays Center13,949
| 8–14
|- style="background:#bfb;"
| 23
| December 4
| @ Atlanta
| 
| Caris LeVert (17)
| Rondae Hollis-Jefferson (10)
| Dinwiddie, LeVert (6)
| Philips Arena12,056
| 9–14
|- style="background:#bfb;"
| 24
| December 7
| Oklahoma City
| 
| Caris LeVert (21)
| DeMarre Carroll (9)
| Caris LeVert (10)
| Mexico City Arena20,562
| 10–14
|- style="background:#fcc;"
| 25
| December 9
| Miami
| 
| Rondae Hollis-Jefferson (18)
| Rondae Hollis-Jefferson (8)
| Spencer Dinwiddie (9)
| Mexico City Arena19,777
| 10–15
|- style="background:#bfb;"
| 26
| December 12
| Washington
| 
| Hollis-Jefferson, LeVert (16)
| Rondae Hollis-Jefferson (12)
| Spencer Dinwiddie (12)
| Barclays Center14,515
| 11–15
|- style="background:#fcc;"
| 27
| December 14
| New York
| 
| Spencer Dinwiddie (26)
| Tyler Zeller (8)
| Spencer Dinwiddie (7)
| Barclays Center17,732
| 11–16
|- style="background:#fcc;'
| 28
| December 15
| @ Toronto
| 
| Nik Stauskas (22)
| Acy, Stauskas (7)
| Spencer Dinwiddie (5)
| Air Canada Centre19,800
| 11–17
|- style="background:#fcc;"
| 29
| December 17
| Indiana
| 
| Allen Crabbe (17)
| Rondae Hollis-Jefferson (6)
| Spencer Dinwiddie (9)
| Barclays Center13,934
| 11–18
|- style="background:#fcc;"
| 30
| December 20
| Sacramento
| 
| Spencer Dinwiddie (16)
| Rondae Hollis-Jefferson (10)
| Dinwiddie, LeVert (4)
| Barclays Center13,179
| 11–19
|- style="background:#bfb;"
| 31
| December 22
| Washington
| 
| Rondae Hollis-Jefferson (21)
| Rondae Hollis-Jefferson (11)
| Joe Harris (7)
| Barclays Center15,589
| 12–19
|- style="background:#fcc;"
| 32
| December 23
| @ Indiana
| 
| Spencer Dinwiddie (26)
| DeMarre Carroll (13)
| Spencer Dinwiddie (8)
| Bankers Life Fieldhouse18,165
| 12–20
|- style="background:#fcc;"
| 33
| December 26
| @ San Antonio
| 
| Caris LeVert (18)
| Quincy Acy (10)
| Spencer Dinwiddie (7)
| AT&T Center18,492
| 12–21
|- style="background:#fcc;"
| 34
| December 27
| @ New Orleans
| 
| Caris LeVert (22)
| Rondae Hollis-Jefferson (7)
| Caris LeVert (7)
| Smoothie King Center16,707
| 12–22
|- style="background:#bfb;"
| 35
| December 29
| @ Miami
| 
| Joe Harris (21)
| Jarrett Allen (9)
| Caris LeVert (11)
| American Airlines Arena19,600
| 13–22
|- style="background:#fcc;"
| 36
| December 31
| @ Boston
| 
| Rondae Hollis-Jefferson (22)
| Rondae Hollis-Jefferson (12)
| Spencer Dinwiddie (9)
| TD Garden18,624
| 13–23

|- style="background:#bfb;"
| 37
| January 1
| Orlando
| 
| Jarrett Allen (16)
| DeMarre Carroll (10)
| Caris LeVert (8)
| Barclays Center16,164
| 14–23
|- style="background:#bfb;"
| 38
| January 3
| Minnesota
| 
| Spencer Dinwiddie (26)
| Allen Crabbe (8)
| Spencer Dinwiddie (9)
| Barclays Center16,215
| 15–23
|- style="background:#fcc;"
| 39
| January 6
| Boston
| 
| Spencer Dinwiddie (20)
| Joe Harris (12)
| Spencer Dinwiddie (3)
| Barclays Center17,732
| 15–24
|- style="background:#fcc;"
| 40
| January 8
| Toronto
| 
| Spencer Dinwiddie (31)
| Rondae Hollis-Jefferson (17)
| Spencer Dinwiddie (8)
| Barclays Center13,681
| 15–25
|- style="background:#fcc;"
| 41
| January 10
| Detroit
| 
| Allen Crabbe (20)
| Rondae Hollis-Jefferson (7)
| Crabbe, Dinwiddie, Hollis-Jefferson, LeVert (3)
| Barclays Center13,457
| 15–26
|- style="background:#bfb;"
| 42
| January 12
| @ Atlanta
| 
| Spencer Dinwiddie (20)
| Spencer Dinwiddie (9)
| Spencer Dinwiddie (10)
| Philips Arena13,093
| 16–26
|- style="background:#fcc;"
| 43
| January 13
| @ Washington
| 
| Rondae Hollis-Jefferson (22)
| DeMarre Carroll (10)
| Caris LeVert (8)
| Capital One Arena18,354
| 16–27
|- style="background:#fcc;"
| 44
| January 15
| NY Knicks
| 
| DeMarre Carroll (22)
| DeMarre Carroll (8)
| Spencer Dinwiddie (5)
| Barclays Center17,732
| 16–28
|- style="background:#fcc;"
| 45
| January 17
| San Antonio
| 
| Allen Crabbe (20)
| DeMarre Carroll (10)
| Spencer Dinwiddie (13)
| Barclays Center15,425
| 16–29
|- style="background:#bfb;"
| 46
| January 19
| Miami
| 
| DeMarre Carroll (26)
| Jarrett Allen (7)
| Caris LeVert (5)
| Barclays Center17,732
| 17–29
|- style="background:#bfb;"
| 47
| January 21
| @ Detroit
| 
| Spencer Dinwiddie (22)
| Tyler Zeller (9)
| Rondae Hollis-Jefferson (7)
| Little Caesars Arena17,554
| 18–29
|- style="background:#fcc;"
| 48
| January 23
| @ Oklahoma City
| 
| Joe Harris (19)
| Jarrett Allen (11)
| Spencer Dinwiddie (7)
| Chesapeake Energy Arena18,203
| 18–30
|- style="background:#fcc;"
| 49
| January 26
| @ Milwaukee
| 
| Carroll, Russell (14)
| Carroll, LeVert (9)
| Caris LeVert (4)
| Bradley Center18,717
| 18–31
|- style="background:#fcc;"
| 50
| January 27
| @ Minnesota
| 
| Jahlil Okafor (21)
| Quincy Acy (7)
| Spencer Dinwiddie (10)
| Target Center16,231
| 18–32
|- style="background:#fcc;"
| 51
| January 30
| @ NY Knicks
| 
| DeMarre Carroll (13)
| Jahlil Okafor (13)
| Spencer Dinwiddie (7)
| Madison Square Garden19,505
| 18–33
|- style="background:#bfb;"
| 52
| January 31
| Philadelphia
| 
| Spencer Dinwiddie (24)
| Jarrett Allen (12)
| DeMarre Carroll (5)
| Barclays Center15,577
| 19–33

|- style="background:#fcc;"
| 53
| February 2
| LA Lakers
| 
| Spencer Dinwiddie (23)
| Dinwiddie, Harris (7)
| Spencer Dinwiddie (9)
| Barclays Center17,732
| 19–34
|- style="background:#fcc;"
| 54
| February 4
| Milwaukee
| 
| Carroll, LeVert (15)
| Jarrett Allen (7)
| Spencer Dinwiddie (10)
| Barclays Center14,392
| 19–35
|- style="background:#fcc;"
| 55
| February 6
| Houston
| 
| DeMarre Carroll (23)
| Joe Harris (8)
| Spencer Dinwiddie (9)
| Barclays Center15,064
| 19–36
|- style="background:#fcc;"
| 56
| February 7
| @ Detroit
| 
| Allen Crabbe (34)
| Jarrett Allen (14)
| Spencer Dinwiddie (11)
| Little Caesars Arena15,114
| 19–37
|- style="background:#fcc;"
| 57
| February 10
| New Orleans
| 
| Allen Crabbe (28)
| Joe Harris (10)
| Spencer Dinwiddie (10)
| Barclays Center16,572
| 19–38
|- style="background:#fcc;"
| 58
| February 12
| LA Clippers
| 
| D'Angelo Russell (16)
| DeMarre Carroll (10)
| Spencer Dinwiddie (8)
| Barclays Center13,735
| 19–39
|- style="background:#fcc;"
| 59
| February 14
| Indiana
| 
| Allen Crabbe (24)
| DeMarre Carroll (10)
| D'Angelo Russell (9)
| Barclays Center13,159
| 19–40
|- style="background:#fcc;"
| 60
| February 22
| @ Charlotte
| 
| Dante Cunningham (22)
| Dante Cunningham (12)
| Spencer Dinwiddie (9)
| Spectrum Center19,077
| 19–41
|- style="background:#bfb;"
| 61
| February 26
| Chicago
| 
| Allen Crabbe (21)
| Allen, Cunningham (9)
| Spencer Dinwiddie (9)
| Barclays Center15,081
| 20–41
|- style="background:#fcc;"
| 62
| February 27
| @ Cleveland
| 
| D'Angelo Russell (25)
| Rondae Hollis-Jefferson (7)
| Spencer Dinwiddie (11)
| Quicken Loans Arena20,562
| 20–42

|- style="background:#fcc;"
| 63
| March 1
| @ Sacramento
| 
| DeMarre Carroll (22)
| Jarrett Allen (13)
| D'Angelo Russell (12)
| Golden 1 Center17,583
| 20–43
|- style="background:#fcc;"
| 64
| March 4
| @ LA Clippers
| 
| Caris LeVert (20)
| Rondae Hollis-Jefferson (8)
| Spencer Dinwiddie (10)
| Staples Center16,384
| 20–44
|- style="background:#fcc;"
| 65
| March 6
| @ Golden State
| 
| D'Angelo Russell (22)
| DeMarre Carroll (7)
| D'Angelo Russell (8)
| Oracle Arena19,596
| 20–45
|- style="background:#bfb;"
| 66
| March 8
| @ Charlotte
| 
| Allen Crabbe (29)
| Rondae Hollis-Jefferson (12)
| Spencer Dinwiddie (10)
| Spectrum Center14,173
| 21–45
|- style="background:#fcc;"
| 67
| March 11
| Philadelphia
| 
| D'Angelo Russell (26)
| Allen, Carroll, Cunningham, Hollis-Jefferson (6)
| Spencer Dinwiddie (6)
| Barclays Center16,901
| 21–46
|- style="background:#fcc;"
| 68
| March 13
| Toronto
| 
| D'Angelo Russell (32)
| Hollis-Jefferson, Russell (7)
| Caris LeVert (7)
| Barclays Center16,654
| 21–47
|- style="background:#fcc;"
| 69
| March 16
| @ Philadelphia
| 
| Rondae Hollis-Jefferson (21)
| DeMarre Carroll (11)
| Joe Harris (6)
| Wells Fargo Center20,666
| 21–48
|- style="background:#bfb;"
| 70
| March 17
| Dallas
| 
| Rondae Hollis-Jefferson (23)
| DeMarre Carroll (12)
| D'Angelo Russell (6)
| Barclays Center13,877
| 22–48
|- style="background:#bfb;"
| 71
| March 19
| Memphis
| 
| Crabbe, LeVert (22)
| Rondae Hollis-Jefferson (12)
| D'Angelo Russell (7)
| Barclays Center12,856
| 23–48
|- style="background:#fcc;"
| 72
| March 21
| Charlotte
| 
| D'Angelo Russell (19)
| Jarrett Allen (9)
| D'Angelo Russell (5)
| Barclays Center10,231
| 23–49
|- style="background:#fcc;"
| 73
| March 23
| @ Toronto
| 
| Crabbe, Hollis-Jefferson, Russell (18)
| D'Angelo Russell (11)
| D'Angelo Russell (13)
| Air Canada Centre19,800
| 23–50
|- style="background:#fcc;"
| 74
| March 25
| Cleveland
| 
| Joe Harris (30)
| Harris, Hollis-Jefferson (7)
| Caris LeVert (7)
| Barclays Center17,732
| 23–51
|- style="background:#bfb;"
| 75
| March 28
| @ Orlando
| 
| LeVert, Russell (16)
| DeMarre Carroll (12)
| D'Angelo Russell (12)
| Amway Center16,517
| 24–51
|- style="background:#bfb;"
| 76
| March 31
| @ Miami
| 
| Rondae Hollis-Jefferson (20)
| Rondae Hollis-Jefferson (14)
| Spencer Dinwiddie (12)
| American Airlines Arena19,600
| 25–51

|- style="background:#fcc;"
| 77
| April 1
| Detroit
| 
| Allen, Harris (15)
| Rondae Hollis-Jefferson (8)
| LeVert, Russell (7)
| Barclays Center16,097
| 25–52
|- style="background:#fcc;"
| 78
| April 3
| @ Philadelphia
| 
| Spencer Dinwiddie (16)
| Dinwiddie, Russell (6)
| Spencer Dinwiddie (6)
| Wells Fargo Center20,710
| 25–53
|- style="background:#bfb;"
| 79
| April 5
| @ Milwaukee
| 
| Allen Crabbe (25)
| Rondae Hollis-Jefferson (11)
| Joe Harris (6)
| Bradley Center18,376
| 26–53
|- style="background:#bfb;"
| 80
| April 7
| @ Chicago
| 
| Quincy Acy (21)
| Dante Cunningham (12)
| Spencer Dinwiddie (9)
| United Center21,669
| 27–53
|- style="background:#bfb;"
| 81
| April 9
| Chicago
| 
| Allen Crabbe (41)
| Hollis-Jefferson, Russell (6)
| D'Angelo Russell (11)
| Barclays Center16,187
| 28–53
|- style="background:#fcc;"
| 82
| April 11
| @ Boston
| 
| Nik Stauskas (18)
| Jarrett Allen (7)
| Caris LeVert (6)
| TD Garden18,624
| 28–54

Standings

Division

Conference

Transactions

Trades

Free agency

Additions

Subtractions

References

Brooklyn Nets season
Brooklyn Nets seasons
Brooklyn Nets
Brooklyn Nets
2010s in Brooklyn
Events in Brooklyn, New York
Prospect Heights, Brooklyn